Australian New Zealanders refers to New Zealanders whose origins are in Australia, as well as Australian migrants and expatriates based in New Zealand.

History & Relationship 
New Zealand and Australia were both colonised by Britain and remain under the commonwealth. New Zealand was originally constitutionally recognised as an extension of the New South Wales colony until it became a separate colony in 1841. New Zealand declined to join the Australian federation in 1901 however the two countries political alliance remained strong. It was not until the 1990s that New Zealand and Australia gained formal government ties again sitting on the Council of Australian Governments from 1992, entering the Trans-Tasman Mutual Recognition Arrangement from 1998 and creating the National Federation Reforms Council in 2020.  Today Australia and New Zealand are both one of each other's strongest bilateral relationships.

New Zealand and Australia have a history of joint defence deployment that began in Gallipoli in 1915. This began the foundations of the ANZAC alliance which is still celebrated in both countries to this day. Recent joint military operations include Afghanistan, Iraq, Solomon Islands and Timor-Leste. The two countries still celebrate Anzac day together on the 25th of April annually to remember the Anzac troops who have lost their lives.

The Anzac biscuit is considered to be the national biscuit in both Australia and New Zealand. The lamington and pavlova are also well shared traditional desserts of both countries with a long debated history of where the desserts originate. Commonalities between the two countries culture does not stop there. New Zealanders have long been involved in Australian sport, whether as spectators for the Melbourne Cup or included in national rugby competitions. New Zealand however has not fully adopted the Australian delicacy Vegemite, Marmite is a very popular alternative in New Zealand.

Demographics 
The migration of citizens between Australia and New Zealand has been steady since the 1800s. Many of the early New Zealand Settlers came from Australia. In the 1860s there was a big influx of Australians moving to New Zealand in pursuit of gold mining.

In more recent history there is a trend towards more New Zealanders moving to Australia however there has been a decrease in this trend over the years. In the early 2010s an average of 27,000 New Zealanders per year moved to Australia. By the late 2010s this yearly average decreased to 3,000 New Zealanders moving to Australia. There have only been a few occasions that the migration flow has leaned towards New Zealand gaining; December 2014, September 2015, December 2016, December 2017. From December 2019 until September 2020 New Zealand had a consistent higher influx of Australians moving to New Zealand than New Zealanders moving to Australia. The COVID-19 Pandemic could have had an effect on this as New Zealand was experiences far less positive cases and lockdowns than some Australian cities during this time.

In March 2021 New Zealanders moving to Australia made up 70% of the countries migration departures.

Australian ethnic group 
There were 29,349 people identifying as being part of the Australian ethnic group at the 2018 New Zealand census, making up 0.62% of New Zealand's population. This is an increase of 6,879 people (30.6%) since the 2013 census, and an increase of 3,079 people (11.7%) since the 2006 census. Some of the increase between the 2013 and 2018 census was due to Statistics New Zealand adding ethnicity data from other sources (previous censuses, administrative data, and imputation) to the 2018 census data to reduce the number of non-responses.

There were 13,530 males and 15,816 females, giving a sex ratio of 0.855 males per female. The median was 38.8 years, compared to 37.4 years for all New Zealanders; 5,589 people (19.0%) were aged under 15 years, 5,121 (17.4%) were 15 to 29, 14,544 (49.6%) were 30 to 64, and 4,092 (13.9%) were 65 or older.

In terms of population distribution, 71.8% live in the North Island and 28.2% live in the South Island. The Queenstown-Lakes District has the highest concentration of Australian-ethnic people at 2.2%, followed by Waiheke Island (1.9%) and the Great Barrier Island (1.4%). The Māngere-Ōtāhuhu local board area of Auckland had the lowest concentration of Australian-ethnic people at 0.15%, followed by the Ōtara-Papatoetoe local board area (0.27%) and the Manurewa local board area (0.27%), The Wairoa district had the lowest concentration of Australian-ethnic people outside Auckland at 0.36%.

Australia birthplace 
There were 75,810 people in New Zealand born in Australia at the 2018 New Zealand census. This is an increase of 13,098 people (20.9%) since the 2013 census, and an increase of 13,068 people (20.8%) since the 2006 census.

There were 35,859 males and 39,948 females, giving a sex ratio of 0.898 males per female. Of the population, 17,475 people (23.1%) were aged under 15 years, 16,869 (22.3%) were 15 to 29, 31,686 (41.8%) were 30 to 64, and 9,780 (12.9%) were 65 or older.

Cultural differences 
Both Australia and New Zealand share historical, cultural and geographical connections, as well as being Commonwealth realms. Migration flows between the two countries have been constant and evenly throughout history from colonial times.

New Zealand's first nation peoples are the Maori people. Maori People make up 15% of New Zealand's population and they speak the language known as Maori as well. New Zealand includes Maori culture a lot more both socially and politically. Maori words and phrases are used frequently, including Kia Ora which means hello, good bye and can be used in the same context as cheers. This phrase should be understood by anyone living in New Zealand as it is used as commonly as the Australian slang G’day. Traditional place names are also listed on road signs throughout New Zealand. Although this is also the case in some parts of Australia it is a more consistent expectation in New Zealand. The New Zealand government also have a number of dedicated seats in parliament which are occupied by Maori people, this ensures there is a level of Maori representation in the political system and decision making. There is in general more of a focus and respect of the indigenous population in New Zealand than in Australia.

New Zealand has a cheaper cost of living on average. Sydney, which is Australia's most expensive city, ranks 66th most expensive city in the world according to Mercer's Cost of living survey in 2020. Auckland, New Zealand's most expensive city, ranked 103rd in the same survey.

New Zealand experiences earthquakes a lot more frequently and severely than Australia. New Zealand is situated along tectonic plates fault lines which results in more earthquakes being experienced in New Zealand than Australia. Earthquakes happen every single day in New Zealand with an estimation of 14.5 thousand earthquakes occurring in New Zealand and in close seas each year. However, not all of these earthquakes can be felt by humans. Between 150 and 200 earthquakes each year are strong enough to be felt by people in New Zealand. Earthquakes can have a ripple effect that causes more natural disasters including tsunamis and landslides. As earthquakes are so common in New Zealand, New Zealanders are taught what to do when one occurs. The standard advice from the New Zealand government is to Drop, Cover, Hold. This means dropping to the ground and not attempting to move too far. Cover refers to the protection of your body, crouching over your knees to protect your organs and covering your head with your arms, if you are close it is recommended to crawl under a sturdy piece of furniture (like a table) and stay in this position for the duration of the earthquake. Hold refers to holding the protective position and onto the furniture one is under. It also refers to holding still for the duration of the earthquake. Many earthquakes have multiple aftershocks so it is important to be aware of these and stand again only once these have subsided. Earthquakes can result in property damage and injury and can be fatal in some cases. The 2011 Christchurch earthquake was a magnitude 6.2 earthquake which caused a lot of property damage, including historic buildings and killed 185 people. The country mourns this earthquake as one of the most devastating in recent history. Christchurch has since erected official and unofficial memorials of remembrance.

Legalities 
Australians do not need a visa to visit New Zealand however it is very easy for Australians who decide to stay in New Zealand for longer periods of time to obtain a visa. Australian citizens and permanent Australian residents can apply for a permanent resident visa to live, work and study in New Zealand. This visa has to be applied for once on New Zealand territory. The visa is guaranteed on arrival. A good character assessment will also be conducted which assesses you based on criminal history, have any exclusions from any other countries, or if New Zealand has reason to believe you are of risk to their security. Failure to meet the good character assessment can result in the rejection of permanent resident visa and a ban on entering New Zealand. There is no cost in applying or obtaining the permanent resident visa for an Australian citizen or Australian permanent resident. After being a permanent resident for 5 years an Australian can apply for citizenship, either sole citizenship or dual citizenship with Australia. To obtain New Zealand citizenship you must pass a character assessment again, an English language requirement and prove you have been present in New Zealand for 5 years.

Australians who are eligible for Aged Pension payments can continue to claim them when working and living in New Zealand. New Zealand and Australia have a social security agreement that allows for this by counting the working period of a person from both countries.

As an Australian citizen, who lives in New Zealand, you are also eligible for New Zealand's super scheme KiwiSaver. KiwiSaver requires a contribution from your wage of which your employer will match, the government will also contribute annually. When starting a job in New Zealand your employer will automatically enrol you into the scheme. Any money obtained in the Australian super system can be transferred over to KiwiSaver. As an Australian, all income obtained from New Zealand's workforce is also subject to New Zealand's income tax. Australians working in New Zealand will need to apply for an IRD number (Inland Revenue Department) which will act as a tax file number.

Being an Australian citizen or permanent resident allows access to New Zealand's publicly funded health care system on one condition. You must demonstrate an intention to stay on New Zealand for at least two years. If an Australian resident does not intend to stay for two years they only have access to the emergency, maternity and pharmaceutical services. All other services including GP visits will need to be paid for in full and up front. This is often referred to as the casual rate.

Australian citizens who attend an education institution in New Zealand are classified as domestic students and therefore only pay the local fees. A vast majority of primary and secondary schools are free in New Zealand. Tertiary fees for Australians are the same as New Zealanders however Australians can only apply for Student Loans and Student Allowances if they have lived in New Zealand for three years at least.  

Purchasing a property or renting in New Zealand is the same for Australians as it is for New Zealanders if the Australians plans to reside in said property. If an Australian wants to buy property in New Zealand and does not plan to live there they will be need to apply for consent under New Zealand's Overseas Investment Regulations. Anyone over the age of 18 who are permanent residents of New Zealand or have lived in New Zealand for one year continuously in their life are required to vote in the New Zealand government elections.

Australians in New Zealand are eligible for all WINZ payments. They become eligible for tertiary student allowances after two years and can apply for citizenship after five years.

Notable Australian New Zealanders
Keisha Castle-Hughes, actress – born in Donnybrook, WA
Andrew Durante, footballer - born in Sydney
Russel Norman, politician, former co-leader of the New Zealand Green Party – born in Brisbane
Matt Robson, politician – born in Brisbane
Michael Joseph Savage, 23rd Prime Minister of New Zealand (1935–40) – born in Tatong, Victoria 
 Several other members of the First Labour Government (and party leader Harry Holland) were from Australia: Mark Fagan, Mabel Howard, Bill Parry, Bob Semple and Paddy Webb.  
Joseph Ward, 17th Prime Minister of New Zealand (1906–12, 1928–30) – born in Melbourne
Sonny Bill Williams, professional rugby union player and boxer – mother is half-Australian

See also

 European New Zealanders
 Europeans in Oceania
 Immigration to New Zealand
 New Zealander Australians

References

 
New Zealand
Oceanian New Zealander